{{DISPLAYTITLE:C21H24N2O4}}
The molecular formula C21H24N2O4 may refer to:

 Carmoterol
 Cyclarbamate, also known as cyclopentaphene
 Mitraphylline
 Vincoline

Molecular formulas